Udoka is a Nigerian given name and surname.  Notable people with the name include:

Given name
Udoka Azubuike, Nigerian basketball player
Udoka Godwin-Malife, English footballer
Udoka Oyeka, Nigerian actor and director

Surname
Chinedu Udoka (born 1992), Nigerian footballer 
Ime Udoka (born 1977), Nigerian-American basketball coach and former player
Mfon Udoka (born 1976), Nigerian-American basketball player, sister of Ime Udoka

Surnames of Nigerian origin